La Rochefoucauld is a former commune in the Charente department in southwestern France. On 1 January 2019, it was merged into the new commune La Rochefoucauld-en-Angoumois.

It lies very close to the line which delineated occupied France and Vichy France during World War II.

Etymology
The village takes its name from the large chateau above the village, which is partially open to the public. It is also still inhabited by the Duke and Duchess.

The site was first used around 980 by Fucaldus, younger brother of the Viscount of Limoges. Fucaldus set up a fortified camp on the rock and called it Fucaldus in rupe, or Foucald's Rock.

Population

Chateau

Early in the 11th century, the son of Fucaldus built a square keep, still identifiable at the heart of the present site. Two entrance towers were built from 1350, with three angle towers following, along with a heightening of the keep, in 1453. Galleries and a grand staircase, the latter attributed to designs by Leonardo da Vinci, were added in 1520. Much of the medieval building was demolished in 1615 when the courtyard was opened out and improvements were made to honour a visit by Louis XIII of France. There was some rebuilding in 1760, following a fire.

Following subsidence problems affecting the keep in the 1960s, the building is currently in the midst of restoration, during which time one wing remains a family home and much of the rest is open to the public. Guided tours of the libraries are sometimes available, and there are costumes for children and adults to wear during their exploration of the rest of the public areas, which include several furnished rooms, and some of the foundations within the rock.

Other features
In the village is a classic car dealership which is open to the public 365 days of the year and is decorated with motoring memorabilia, functioning essentially as a free-to-enter motor museum.

In the Rivieres District, there is a large supermarket, pharmacy, vets, petrol station.

In the old part of town is an "Abbey", public toilets and nearby shopping streets. On the outskirts is a small chocalatier factory and shop.

See also
François de La Rochefoucauld (cardinal)
François de La Rochefoucauld (writer)
Communes of the Charente department

References
Château de La Rochefoucauld visitors' handout.

Former communes of Charente
Castles in Nouvelle-Aquitaine
Châteaux in Charente
Angoumois
Populated places disestablished in 2019